The Rat Pack is a 1998 American HBO made-for-television drama film about the Rat Pack. The movie stars Ray Liotta as Frank Sinatra, Joe Mantegna as Dean Martin, Don Cheadle as Sammy Davis, Jr., and Angus Macfadyen as Peter Lawford. Despite his membership in the Pack, Joey Bishop (played by Bobby Slayton) is given minimal screen time, while John F. Kennedy (played by William L. Petersen), depicted as an on-and-off friend of Sinatra's, is given a more central role.

Also featured in supporting roles are Željko Ivanek as Bobby Kennedy, Veronica Cartwright as  Rocky Cooper (wife of Gary Cooper), Deborah Kara Unger as Ava Gardner, Megan Dodds as May Britt, Dan O'Herlihy as Joseph Kennedy, Robert Miranda as Sam Giancana, John Diehl as Joe DiMaggio and Barbara Niven as Marilyn Monroe.

Don Cheadle won a Golden Globe for his performance as Sammy Davis Jr. The Rat Pack won three Emmy awards and earned several more nominations, including acting ones for Cheadle and Mantegna.

Plot

The main icon Frank Sinatra discusses the movie's main narrative begins during high points in the solo careers of the Rat Pack: Dean Martin was doing well without the help of the Rat Pack posy Jerry Lewis; Sinatra's career never dwindled and was actually doing better than ever during this moment; Sammy Davis Jr., is recovering not only his career, but his health after a car crash in which he lost an eyeball, and standup comic Joey Bishop is attempting to get his foot in the door by doing opening comedy acts. The Pack merges into one whole unite with actor Peter Lawford, who has been ostracized since being caught in the public eye with Sinatra's ex-wife, Ava Gardner.

Lawford has married Patricia Kennedy. Abandoning a notion to seduce Pat for his own amusement, Sinatra becomes more interested in her brother John F. Kennedy's political goals. He sincerely believes Jack Kennedy would be a great president, but he also feels having a close connection in the White House could majorly benefit his own public image. Sinatra arranges for the entire Pack to perform at a JFK campaign fund-raiser. Sinatra also knows Kennedy's infatuation with the opposite sex and introduces him to Marilyn Monroe, who begins seeing Kennedy behind the back of her husband, baseball star Joe DiMaggio.

Kennedy's pompous father, Joseph P. Kennedy, feels Sinatra's mob ties might hurt Jack's chances of defeating Richard Nixon in the election. He insists that Sinatra help the campaign from behind the scenes only; hypocritically, he also asks Sinatra to use those same mob ties to pursue West Virginia unions' support Kennedy's way. They go on to combine their stage acts for joint performances. They even parlay their friendship into a movie collaboration, Ocean's 11, working and playing together at the same time.

Davis is sometimes secretly hurt by the racist jokes of their stage act, especially after his girlfriend, actress May Britt, insinuates that the rest of the Pack is laughing at him, not with him.  Davis has a more serious brush with racism when he and Britt announce their engagement, which results in a mixed-marriage protest in front of Davis's hotel. Davis day-dreams about scaring the protesters away with a song and dance routine in which he wields a gun. But he concedes the possible political repercussions of an interracial marriage. He postpones the wedding to avoid hurting Sinatra, who had agreed to serve as best man. In the White House, President Kennedy seeks to renew his friendship with Sinatra.  The two go sailing and plan for Kennedy to stay at Sinatra's Palm Springs residence during an upcoming West Coast presidential trip.  Thrilled by the idea, Sinatra returns home and arranges for a guest compound to be built for Kennedy and his entourage.

However, the FBI finds a potential mafia link to the White House through a woman, Judy Campbell, who shared phone calls, and possibly affairs, with both Kennedy and mob boss Sam "Momo" Giancana after being introduced by Sinatra to each.  Kennedy's brother, attorney general Robert F. Kennedy, insists that the President cancel his stay at Sinatra's house and cut off all ties to the entertainer.  This enrages Sinatra, who had sunk a lot of money and time into the renovation and had been at least partially responsible for Kennedy's being elected president. Sinatra takes out his wrath on Lawford, who as Kennedy's brother-in-law was Sinatra's direct link to the White House. Lawford finds himself repeatedly serving as a messenger between Sinatra and the Kennedys, including JFK's secret dalliances with Monroe, and he is sick of it. Lawford dreads delivering the news of Kennedy's decision to cancel his visit to Sinatra's house and stay instead with Bing Crosby, a Republican. A furious Sinatra physically throws Lawford out of his home and vows never to forgive him. The movie depicts this incident as the beginning of the end of the Rat Pack's influence in both politics and entertainment.

Cast 
 Ray Liotta as Frank Sinatra
 Michael Dees as his singing voice
 Joe Mantegna as Dean Martin
 Warren Wiebe as his singing voice
 Don Cheadle as Sammy Davis Jr.
 Gunnar Madsen as his singing voice
 Angus Macfadyen as Peter Lawford
 Bobby Slayton as Joey Bishop
 William L. Petersen as John F. Kennedy
 Željko Ivanek as Robert F. Kennedy
 Dan O'Herlihy as Joseph Kennedy
 Deborah Kara Unger as Ava Gardner
 John Diehl as Joe DiMaggio
 Megan Dodds as May Britt
 Veronica Cartwright as Rocky Cooper
 Barbara Niven as Marilyn Monroe
 Michelle Grace as Judy Campbell
 Craig Richard Nelson as Lewis Milestone

Reception 
On Rotten Tomatoes, the film holds an approval rating of 57% based on 30 reviews, with an average rating of 6/10. The site's critics consensus reads: "While it evokes its time period with a keen sense of swagger, The Rat Pack is troubled by uneven lead performances and fairly routine biopic trappings."

See also
 Cultural depictions of John F. Kennedy

References

External links 
 
 

1998 television films
1998 films

Films about Frank Sinatra
Films directed by Rob Cohen
Films set in California
HBO Films films
Original Film films
Cultural depictions of John F. Kennedy
Cultural depictions of Robert F. Kennedy
Cultural depictions of Frank Sinatra
Cultural depictions of Marilyn Monroe
Cultural depictions of Joe DiMaggio
Cultural depictions of Sammy Davis Jr.
Cultural depictions of Sam Giancana
Films set in the 1960s
1990s English-language films